Disney's Freaky Friday (also known simply as Freaky Friday), is a 1995 American made-for-television fantasy-comedy film adaptation of the 1976 movie of the same name, and is the second installment overall in the Freaky Friday franchise. Produced by Walt Disney Television, the film premiered on May 6, 1995 as an ABC Family Movie. It It was the last in a series of four remakes of live-action Disney films produced for broadcast on ABC during the 1994–95 television season, the other three being The Shaggy Dog, The Computer Wore Tennis Shoes, and Escape to Witch Mountain.

Plot
A mother, Ellen (Shelley Long), and daughter, Annabelle (Gaby Hoffmann), find it difficult to get along with each other because of their different views on their own lives and each other's. A pair of magical amulets causes the two of them to switch bodies for a day. Ellen's boyfriend, Bill, drives them both to work where she has to present a new clothing line. She, initially worried about the fact that she has no idea of what to do, goes along with it anyway. Meanwhile, Annabelle has an awkward day at school with her friends and she learns what her daughter's life is really like. Back at her job, Ellen and Bill eventually have an argument (with Annabelle saying how she feels about Bill in her mother's body). He later apologizes to "Ellen" and proposes to her, much to her horror. "Annabelle" then calls and finally is able to convince Bill that they have truly switched bodies. He then realizes why "Ellen" turned him down. A bit later, they rush down to the diving event the school is holding because "Annabelle" cannot swim. After they save her, they switch back and Annabelle and Ellen finally have a new understanding of what the other has to go through.

Among many changes from the original, this version of the story has diving instead of waterskiing as Annabelle's main hobby, which again plays a big role in the film's climax. Also, in the original film (and the book), Ellen and Bill are married and Bill is Annabelle's father, whereas in this adaptation, Ellen is a single mom and Bill is her new sweetheart. It also reveals how they switched bodies.

Cast
 Shelley Long as Ellen and Annabelle Andrews
 Gaby Hoffmann as Annabelle and Ellen Andrews
 Alan Rosenberg as Bill

In addition to the principal characters, the film has supporting cast appearances by Reagan Gomez-Preston ("Heather"), Drew Carey, Eileen Brennan, Carol Kane, Sandra Bernhard, Jackie Hoffman, Andrew Keegan and Marla Sokoloff.

References

External links
 

1995 television films
1995 films
1990s fantasy comedy films
1990s teen comedy films
American fantasy comedy films
Remakes of American films
American teen comedy films
Films directed by Melanie Mayron
Freaky Friday
Films based on American novels
Disney television films
Disney film remakes
Walt Disney anthology television series episodes
Television remakes of films
Films about mother–daughter relationships
1990s English-language films
1990s American films